The War That Changed Us is a 4-episode Australian television documentary series presenting the true stories of six Australians in World War I. The series, produced by Electric Pictures, based on an original concept by historian Clare Wright, was first shown by the Australian Broadcasting Corporation on four consecutive Sunday evenings commencing on 19 August 2014. Australia entered World War I in August 1914, one hundred years earlier.

Characters
The series follows the range of experiences of the following real-life people:
 soldier Archie Barwick
 army officer Pompey Elliott
 army nurse Kit McNaughton
 Anti-war activist and trade unionist Tom Barker
 Anti-war activist and publisher Vida Goldstein
 Pro-war crusader Eva Hughes

These people were chosen because there was a substantial amount of material they had written. Archie Barwick and Kit McNaughton kept diaries. Pompey Elliott wrote many detailed letters to his wife. The speeches of Tom Barker, Vida Goldstein, and Eva Hughes were widely reported in newspapers. Vida Goldstein also published many opinion pieces.

Further reading
  – a book about Kit McNaughton's experiences as reflected in her diaries

References

Documentary television series about World War I
2014 Australian television series debuts
Television series by Electric Pictures